Bharati Achrekar is an Indian Marathi and Hindi theatre, film and television actress. She has been a part of several films in Indian cinema and was celebrated as Mrs Wagle from the doordarshan show, Wagle ki Duniya. She is currently starring as Radhika Wagle in Wagle Ki Duniya – Nayi Peedhi Naye Kissey.

Career 
Bharati made her acting debut with a Hindi drama Apne Paraye, directed by Basu Chatterjee. The series is based on the 1917 Bengali novel, Nishkriti written by Sarat Chandra.

Filmography

Films

Television

References

External links
 

Living people
20th-century Indian actresses
Indian film actresses
Actresses in Hindi cinema
Indian television actresses
Actresses in Marathi cinema
Actresses in Marathi theatre
Indian stage actresses
Actresses in Hindi television
21st-century Indian actresses
1957 births